The Three Ages of Man may refer to:
The Three Ages of Man (Giorgione)
The Three Ages of Man (Titian)

See also
The Three Ages of Man and Death